An incomposite interval is a concept in the Ancient Greek theory of music concerning melodic musical intervals between neighbouring notes in a tetrachord or scale which, for that reason, do not encompass smaller intervals. ( means "uncompounded".) Aristoxenus (fl. 335 BCE) defines melodically incomposite intervals in the following context:  
In another place, Aristoxenus clarifies that 
It is thus not an issue of the voice being physically incapable of singing a note within an incomposite interval. For example, in the enharmonic genus the distance from the neighbouring scale degrees lichanos to mesē is a ditone—a gap equivalent to the major-third interval between F and A in the modern scale. In such a case the function of the note λιχανός is such that "the 'nature of μελῳδία' somehow requires that it should leap forward at least as far as μέση, without touching down anywhere in between. Any smaller distance is melodically impossible or unintelligible, ἐκμελής".

The nature of the chromatic genus, too, is an attribute of the kinēsis phonēs ("potentiality of the sounds"), so that certain melody types are "brought into being". In other words, "being composite" and "being incomposite" are attributes of the dynamic character of melodic motion. "None of these consists in the voice's coming to rest at points separated by distances of specific and determinate sizes".

An incomposite interval is "bounded by successive notes" in a scale: "If the bounding notes are successive, no note has been left out; if none has been left out, none will intervene; if none intervenes, none will divide the interval; and what does not admit of division will not be composite". Gaudentius (before the 6th century CE) explains incomposite intervals as scale-building elements: 

Aristides Quintilianus (writing probably in the 3rd century AD) enumerates the incomposite intervals: "the smallest, so far as their use in melody is concerned, is the enharmonic diesis, followed—to speak rather roughly—by the semitone, which is twice the diesis, the tone, which is twice the semitone, and finally the ditone, which is twice the tone".

These various sizes of incomposite interval depend on the genus of the tetrachord, as explained by Nicomachus in the first century AD: 

Thus, whether an interval is composite or incomposite is a matter of context (that is, the genus in effect at that point in the melody). A semitone is an incomposite interval in the diatonic or chromatic genera, but not because quarter tone intervals may be difficult to sing in tune. It is a composite interval in the enharmonic genus, where the semitone occurs only as the outer interval of the pyknon, made of two quarter tones.

Following the strict definition found in Nicola Vicentino's L'antica musica ridotta alla moderna prattica (1555), all intervals larger than the major third (or ditone) are necessarily composite. However, for the purpose of his discussion of the "modern practice" of the 16th century, he extended the definition to include larger intervals within the octave. Accordingly, a perfect fourth is "composite" if it is filled in stepwise in a composition (C-D-E-F), but is "incomposite" when it occurs as a melodic leap or harmonic interval, without any intermediary tones.

One 20th-century interpretation is more restrictive than the definitions found in Ancient Greek sources, referring to "a large interval which appears as a melodic step or second in a scale, but which is a skip in other parts of the scale." For example the augmented second in the harmonic minor scale, on A, occurs as a step between F and G, though the equivalent minor third occurs elsewhere, such as a skip between A & C.

See also
Octave species

References

Intervals (music)